Ludwig Beisiegel (21 March 1912 – 21 October 1999) was a German field hockey player who competed in the 1936 Summer Olympics. He was a member of the German field hockey team, which won the silver medal. He played one match as forward.

References
Ludwig Beisiegel's profile at databaseOlympics
Ludwig Beisiegel at the Munich State Archives

External links
 

1912 births
1999 deaths
Field hockey players at the 1936 Summer Olympics
German male field hockey players
Olympic field hockey players of Germany
Olympic silver medalists for Germany
Olympic medalists in field hockey
Medalists at the 1936 Summer Olympics